Wilhoite Nunataks is a group of dark rock nunataks near the polar plateau, about 12 nautical miles (22 km) southwest of All-Blacks Nunataks. Named by Advisory Committee on Antarctic Names (US-ACAN) after the USS ocean station in support of aircraft flights between New Zealand and Antarctica in U.S. Navy Operation Deepfreeze 1961.

Nunataks of Oates Land